

Hunfrith was a medieval Bishop of Winchester.

Hunfrith was consecrated in 744. He died between 749 and 754.

Citations

References

External links
 

Bishops of Winchester
8th-century English bishops
8th-century deaths
Year of birth unknown
Year of death uncertain